Regueiro is a surname. Notable people with the surname include:

Francisco Regueiro (born 1934), Spanish film director and screenwriter
Francisco Javier Suárez Regueiro (born 1977), Spanish cyclist
Julio Casas Regueiro (1936–2011), Cuban politician
Luis Regueiro (1908–1995), Spanish footballer
Luis Regueiro (Mexican footballer) (born 1943), Mexican footballer
Maricarmen Regueiro (born 1966), Venezuelan actress
Mario Regueiro (born 1978), Uruguayan footballer
Melania Ballish Regueiro, American prima ballerina and artistic director 
Pedro Regueiro (1909–1985), Spanish footballer
Sebastián Regueiro (born 1989), Uruguayan footballer
Senén Casas Regueiro (1934-1996), Cuban politician